The 2017 Philippine Basketball Association (PBA) rookie draft was an event that allowed teams to draft players from the amateur ranks. It was held at the Midtown Atrium, Robinsons Place Manila on October 29, 2017. The league determined the drafting order based on the performance of the member teams from the 2016–17 season, with the worst team picking first. The San Miguel Beermen selected first overall after a trade with the Kia Picanto.

Draft order
The draft order is determined based from the overall performance of the teams from the previous season. The Philippine Cup final ranking comprises 40% of the points, while the rankings of the Commissioner's and Governors' Cups are 30% each.

Controversy involving Kia's first round pick
On October 27, 2017, PBA Commissioner Chito Narvasa approved the trade that sent Kia Picanto's first-round pick (first overall), which is used to draft Christian Standhardinger, in exchange for Ronald Tubid, Jay-R Reyes, Rashawn McCarthy and San Miguel's 2019 first-round draft choice, with minimal revisions from the original trade proposal that originally involved Keith Agovida, Reyes, McCarthy and a San Miguel draft pick. The trade proposal already earned the ire of fans as well as Wilfred Steven Uytengsu, team owner of the Alaska Aces, and Dioceldo Sy, team owner of the Blackwater Elite, since Kia traded its opportunity to pick a potential starter in exchange for role players.

In defense of approving the controversial Kia-San Miguel trade, Narvasa cited that TNT KaTropa also tried to make a deal with Kia's first-round pick. Narvasa also stated that TNT's manager Magnum Membrere submitted draft application papers on behalf of Standhardinger, even if Standhardinger already submitted his own papers three weeks before the September 4 draft application deadline for Filipino-descended foreign applicants.

TNT management then released a statement hours after the 2017 draft concluded, blasting Narvasa for being biased and questioned his credibility as the league's commissioner. TNT also clarified that the actions done by Magnum Membrere when submitting Standhardinger's draft application papers were done as a Philippine national basketball team representative.

Draft

1st round

2nd round

3rd round

4th round

5th round

Trades involving draft picks

Pre-draft trades
Note: The rights to Barako Bull's draft picks were retained by Phoenix.

Undrafted player

Draft picks per school

References

External links
 PBA.ph

Philippine Basketball Association draft
draft
Pba draft